Matehal is a village in the Khyber Pakhtunkhwa province of Pakistan. Matehal is situated in a valley located at the boundary area of the Mansehra district and the Abbottabad district, west from the Karakurram highway at Qalanderabad. It is a village of union Council Behali. The Qureshi tribe is the main tribe of Matehal. This valley is surrounded the mountains from all sides.

Etymology
Matehal is named after a Hindu named Mati who first came to this village before the arrival of the Quresh. The Hindus were in the majority at this time but later Awan and Asnal migrated to this village contributing to its Muslim population.

History
Matehal was a multi-cultural village because of the Hindus and Muslims.  All the trade was under the custody of Hindus. The muslim population worked in agriculture and also in the Indian Army.  Some of the brave soldiers from Matehal assisted  the war effort in WWI. In 1947, Pakistan came into existence forcing Hindus to migrate to India. There are still a mix of Hindus and Muslims living in this area, even today.

Education
Matehal only has one primary & Middle School, where the villagers are quenching their thirst for education. In 2007 a man named Khuda Bakhash has taken a huge step in their education sector. He has established a new school system which is being administrated in Mansehra. There, students are enrolled in the main school located in Mansehra city but are taught in their respective villages. As far as high school or college is concerned, there are no opportunities available. Students must travel to Behali, Union Council for secondary education. School in Behali was established by Turks in 1872 which was first ever school in Mansehra district.

References

Populated places in Mansehra District